Papua New Guinea competed at the 2020 Summer Paralympics in Tokyo, Japan, which took place from 24 August to 5 September 2021. This was their sixth appearance at the Summer Paralympics. The Papua New Guinean team consisted of 2 athletes competing in 1 sport.

Competitors
The following is the list of number of competitors participating in the Games.

Athletics 

Field

See also 
 Papua New Guinea at the Paralympics
 Papua New Guinea at the 2020 Summer Olympics

References

External links 
 2020 Summer Paralympics website

Nations at the 2020 Summer Paralympics
2020
Summer Paralympics